The Immaculate Conception Cathedral or Cathedral of Colón and more formally called the Cathedral of the Immaculate Conception of Mary is a religious building belonging to the Catholic Church, and located in the city of Colón to the north of Panama.

Follow the Latin or Roman rite and is the seat of the constituency of the Diocese of Colón-Kuna Yala (Latin: Columbensis-Kunayalensis) created on June 13, 1997, and depends on the ecclesiastical province of Panama.

See also
Roman Catholicism in Panama

References

Roman Catholic cathedrals in Panama
Buildings and structures in Colón, Panama